Mel Boehland is a former American football coach.  He served as the head football coach at Northwestern College—now known as the University of Northwestern – St. Paul—in Roseville, Minnesota from 1982 to 1988 and at North Park College—now known as North Park University—in 1989, compiling a career college football coaching record of 78–64–1.

Coaching career

Northwestern
Boehland was the head football coach at Northwestern College located in Roseville, Minnesota, serving for 15 seasons, from 1974 to 1988, compiling a record of 77–56–1.

North Park
After Northwestern, Boehland became the head football coach at coach for the North Park College in Chicago, Illinois.  He held that position for the 1989 season, compiling a record of 1–8.

References

Year of birth missing (living people)
Living people
Northwestern Eagles football coaches
North Park Vikings football coaches